= Devripur Sujauta =

Village in Uttar Pradesh, India

Devripur Sujauta is a village in Prayagraj, Uttar Pradesh, India.
